Seikyu Ri, or Lee Seong-Gu, (1 January 1911 – 14 October 2002) was a Korean basketball player. He competed in the men's tournament at the 1936 Summer Olympics, representing Japan.

References

External links
 

1911 births
2002 deaths
Japanese men's basketball players
South Korean men's basketball players
Olympic basketball players of Japan
Basketball players at the 1936 Summer Olympics
People from Cheonan
Sportspeople from South Chungcheong Province